The Dewoitine HD.412 was a prototype French racing floatplane of the 1930s.

Design
The HD.412 was a low-wing monoplane racer of all-metal construction. It used floats for takeoff and landing on water.

Variants
D.40  1929 : racing trainer (project)
HD.40  1930 : seaplane, racing trainer, derivative of the D.40 (project)
D.41  1930 : racing trainer (project)
HD.41  1930 : seaplane, racing trainer, derivative of the D.41 (project)
HD.41  1930 : seaplane, racer
HD.410  1930 : renamed racer HD.41
HD.411  1931 : seaplane, racer (project)
HD.412  1931

Specifications

See also

References

Single-engined tractor aircraft
HD.412
Floatplanes
Low-wing aircraft
Aircraft first flown in 1931